Raymond F. Gallagher (born April 7, 1939) is an American politician from Lackawanna, New York.

Life
Born into an Irish American family, he entered politics as a Democrat. He was a member of the Erie County Legislature (1st D.) from 1972 to 1978; and was Chairman from 1976 to 1978.

On February 14, 1978, he was elected to the New York State Senate, to fill the vacancy caused by the election of James D. Griffin as Mayor of Buffalo. Gallagher was re-elected twice, and remained in the Senate until 1981, sitting in the 182nd, 183rd and 184th New York State Legislatures. He resigned his seat in July 1981, and was appointed as Chairman of the Niagara Frontier Transportation Authority.

He was the Democratic nominee for New York State Comptroller in 1982.

References

1939 births
Democratic Party New York (state) state senators
County legislators in New York (state)
Living people
Politicians from Buffalo, New York